Acanista is a genus of beetles in the family Cerambycidae, containing a single species, Acanista alphoides.. It was described by Francis Polkinghorne Pascoe in 1864.

References

External links

Acanthocinini
Beetles described in 1864
Monotypic Cerambycidae genera
Taxa named by Francis Polkinghorne Pascoe